Billboard Top Rock'n'Roll Hits: 1956 is a compilation album released by Rhino Records in 1988, featuring 10 hit recordings from 1956.

The track lineup includes three songs that reached the top of the Billboard Top 100 chart — two of the tracks "Don't Be Cruel" and "Hound Dog" are treated as a single No. 1 track.

Track listing

See also
1988 in music
1956 in music

1988 compilation albums
Billboard Top Rock'n'Roll Hits albums
Pop rock compilation albums